Charny may refer to:

People
 Geoffroi de Charny, French knight 
 Israel Charny, Israeli psychologist

Places
 Charny, Côte-d'Or, a commune of the Côte-d'Or département, in France;
 Charny, Seine-et-Marne, a commune of the Seine-et-Marne département, in France;
 Charny, Yonne, a commune of the Yonne département, in France;
 Charny, Quebec, a former municipality now amalgamated in the city of Lévis in Quebec, Canada
 Charny-le-Bachot, a commune of the Aube département, in France
 Charny-Orée-de-Puisaye, a commune of the Yonne département, in France
 Charny-sur-Meuse, a commune of the Meuse département, in France
Charnwood, Australian Capital Territory, nicknamed ‘Charny’

See also

Charly (name)
 Thorey-sous-Charny, a commune of the Côte-d'Or département